Wiltshire North

North Wiltshire, a former local government district in the county of Wiltshire, South-West England
North Wiltshire (UK Parliament constituency)